The Tibet Autonomous Region or Xizang Autonomous Region, often shortened to Tibet or Xizang, is a province-level autonomous region of the People's Republic of China in Southwest China. It was overlayed on the traditional Tibetan regions of Ü-Tsang and Kham.

It was formally established in 1965 to replace the Tibet Area, the former administrative division of the People's Republic of China (PRC) established after the annexation of Tibet. The establishment was about five years after the 1959 Tibetan uprising and the dismissal of the Kashag, and about 13 years after the original annexation.

The current borders of the Tibet Autonomous Region were generally established in the 18th century and include about half of historic Tibet, or the ethno-cultural Tibet.

History 

 Yarlung kings founded the Tibetan Empire in 618. By the end of the 8th century, the empire reached its greatest extent. After a civil war, the empire broke up in 842. The royal lineage fragmented and ruled over small kingdoms such as Guge, Maryul and Nyingma. The Mongol Empire conquered Tibet in 1244 but granted the region a degree of political autonomy. Kublai Khan later incorporated Tibetans into his Yuan empire (1271–1368). The Sakya lama Drogön Chögyal Phagpa became religious teacher to Kublai in the 1250s, and was made the head of the Tibetan region administration .

From 1354 to 1642, Central Tibet (Ü-Tsang) was ruled by a succession of dynasties from Nêdong, Shigatse and Lhasa. In 1642, the Ganden Phodrang court of the 5th Dalai Lama was established by Güshi Khan of the Khoshut Khanate, who was enthroned as King (chogyal) of Tibet. The Khoshuts ruled until 1717, when they were overthrown by the Dzungar Khanate. The Dzungar forces were in turn expelled by the 1720 Manchu  expedition to Tibet during the Dzungar–Qing Wars. This began  Qing rule over Tibet: Tibet came under the direct control of the central Chinese government.

Despite some politically-charged historical debate on the exact nature of  Sino-Tibetan relations, most historians  agree that Tibet under the Ganden Phodrang (1642 to ) was an independent state, albeit the country had been under different foreign suzerainties for much of its history – including during the Ming dynasty period (1368–1644).

From 1912 to 1950, the State of Tibet became de facto independent after the fall of the Qing dynasty, like many other regions of the successor Republic of China. The Republic of China régime, preoccupied with fractious  warlordism (1916–1928),  civil war (1927–1949) and  Japanese invasion (1937–1945), failed to assert its authority in Tibet. Other smaller kingdoms of ethno-cultural Tibet in eastern Kham and Amdo had been under de jure administration of the Chinese dynastic government since the mid-18th century;  they variously form parts of the provinces of Qinghai, Gansu, Sichuan and Yunnan. (See also: Xikang Province)

In 1950, after the 1949 establishment of the People's Republic of China, the People's Liberation Army entered Tibet and defeated the Tibetan local army in a battle fought near the city of Chamdo. In 1951, Tibetan representatives signed a  17-point agreement with the Central People's Government affirming China's sovereignty over Tibet and the annexation of Tibet by the People's Republic of China. The 14th Dalai Lama ratified the agreement in October 1951. After a failed violent  uprising, the 14th Dalai Lama fled to India in 1959 and renounced the 17-point agreement. The  establishment of the Tibet Autonomous Region in 1965 made Tibet a provincial-level division of China.

Geography 

The Tibet Autonomous Region is located on the Tibetan Plateau, the highest region on Earth. Mount Everest is located on Tibet's border with Nepal.

China's provincial-level areas of Xinjiang, Qinghai and Sichuan lie to the north, northeast and east, respectively, of the Tibet AR. There is also a short border with Yunnan Province to the southeast.  The countries to the south and southwest are Myanmar, India, Bhutan, and Nepal. China claims Arunachal Pradesh administered by India as part of the Tibet Autonomous Region. It also claims some areas adjoining the Chumbi Valley that are recognised as Bhutan's territory, and some areas of eastern Ladakh claimed by India. India and China agreed to respect the Line of Actual Control in a bilateral agreement signed on 7 September 1993.

Physically, the Tibet AR may be divided into two parts: the lakes region in the west and north-west and the river region, which spreads out on three sides of the former on the east, south and west. Both regions receive limited amounts of rainfall as they lie in the rain shadow of the Himalayas; however, the region names are useful in contrasting their hydrological structures, and also in contrasting their different cultural uses: nomadic in the lake region and agricultural in the river region. On the south the Tibet AR is bounded by the Himalayas, and on the north by a broad mountain system. The system at no point narrows to a single range; generally there are three or four across its breadth. As a whole the system forms the watershed between rivers flowing to the Indian Ocean — the Indus, Brahmaputra and Salween and its tributaries — and the streams flowing into the undrained salt lakes to the north.

The lake region extends from the Pangong Tso Lake in Ladakh, Lake Rakshastal, Yamdrok Lake and Lake Manasarovar near the source of the Indus River, to the sources of the Salween, the Mekong and the Yangtze. Other lakes include Dagze Co, Namtso, and Pagsum Co. The lake region is a wind-swept Alpine grassland. This region is called the Chang Tang (Byang sang) or 'Northern Plateau' by the people of Tibet. It is  broad and covers an area about equal to that of France. Due to its great distance from the ocean it is extremely arid and possesses no river outlet. The mountain ranges are spread out, rounded, disconnected, and separated by relatively flat valleys.

The Tibet AR is dotted over with large and small lakes, generally salt or alkaline, and intersected by streams. Due to the presence of discontinuous permafrost over the Chang Tang, the soil is boggy and covered with tussocks of grass, thus resembling the Siberian tundra. Salt and fresh-water lakes are intermingled. The lakes are generally without outlet, or have only a small effluent. The deposits consist of soda, potash, borax and common salt. The lake region is noted for a vast number of hot springs, which are widely distributed between the Himalaya and 34° N, but are most numerous to the west of Tengri Nor (north-west of Lhasa). So intense is the cold in this part of Tibet that these springs are sometimes represented by columns of ice, the nearly boiling water having frozen in the act of ejection.

The river region is characterized by fertile mountain valleys and includes the Yarlung Tsangpo River (the upper courses of the Brahmaputra) and its major tributary, the Nyang River, the Salween, the Yangtze, the Mekong, and the Yellow River. The Yarlung Tsangpo Canyon, formed by a horseshoe bend in the river where it flows around Namcha Barwa, is the deepest and possibly longest canyon in the world. Among the mountains there are many narrow valleys. The valleys of Lhasa, Xigazê, Gyantse and the Brahmaputra are free from permafrost, covered with good soil and groves of trees, well irrigated, and richly cultivated.

The South Tibet Valley is formed by the Yarlung Tsangpo River during its middle reaches, where it travels from west to east. Lakes here include Lake Paiku and Lake Puma Yumco.

Government 

The Tibet Autonomous Region is a province-level entity of the People's Republic of China. Chinese law nominally guarantees some autonomy in the areas of education and language policy. Like other subdivisions of China, routine administration is carried out by a People's Government, headed by a chairman, who has been an ethnic Tibetan except for an interregnum during the Cultural Revolution. As with other Chinese provinces, the Chairman carries out work under the direction of the regional secretary of the Chinese Communist Party. The regional standing committee of the Communist Party serves as the top rung of political power in the region. The current Chairman is Yan Jinhai and the current party secretary is Wang Junzheng.

Administrative divisions 

The Autonomous Region is divided into seven prefecture-level divisions: six prefecture-level cities and one prefecture.

These in turn are subdivided into a total of 66 counties and 8 districts (Chengguan, Doilungdêqên, Dagzê, Samzhubzê, Karub, Bayi, Nêdong, and Seni).

Urban areas

Demographics 

With an average of only two people per square kilometer, Tibet has the lowest population density among any of the Chinese province-level administrative regions, mostly due to its harsh and rugged terrain.

In 2011 the Tibetan population was three million.
The ethnic Tibetans, comprising 90.48% of the population, mainly adhere to Tibetan Buddhism and Bön, although there is an ethnic Tibetan Muslim community. Other Muslim ethnic groups such as the Hui and the Salar have inhabited the region. There is also a tiny Tibetan Christian community in eastern Tibet. Smaller tribal groups such as the Monpa and Lhoba, who follow a combination of Tibetan Buddhism and spirit worship, are found mainly in the southeastern parts of the region.

Historically, the population of Tibet consisted of primarily ethnic Tibetans. According to tradition the original ancestors of the Tibetan people, as represented by the six red bands in the Tibetan flag, are: the Se, Mu, Dong, Tong, Dru and Ra. Other traditional ethnic groups with significant population or with the majority of the ethnic group reside in Tibet include Bai people, Blang, Bonan, Dongxiang, Han, Hui people, Lhoba, Lisu people, Miao, Mongols, Monguor (Tu people), Menba (Monpa), Mosuo, Nakhi, Qiang, Nu people, Pumi, Salar, and Yi people.

According to the Encyclopædia Britannica Eleventh Edition published between 1910 and 1911, the total population of the Tibetan capital of Lhasa, including the lamas in the city and vicinity, was about 30,000, and the permanent population also included Chinese families (about 2,000).

Most Han people in the Tibet Autonomous Region (8.17% of the total population) are recent migrants, because all of the Han were expelled from "Outer Tibet" (Central Tibet) following the British invasion until the establishment of the PRC.
Only 8% of Han people have household registration in TAR, others keep their household registration in place of origin.

Tibetan scholars and exiles claim that, with the 2006 completion of the Qingzang Railway connecting the Tibet Autonomous Region to Qinghai Province, there has been an "acceleration" of Han migration into the region. The Tibetan government-in-exile based in northern India asserts that the PRC is promoting the migration of Han workers and soldiers to Tibet to marginalize and assimilate the locals.

Religion 

The main religion in Tibet has been Buddhism since its outspread in the 8th century AD. Before the arrival of Buddhism, the main religion among Tibetans was an indigenous shamanic and animistic religion, Bon, which now comprises a sizeable minority and influenced the formation of Tibetan Buddhism.

According to estimates from the International Religious Freedom Report of 2012, most Tibetans (who comprise 91% of the population of the Tibet Autonomous Region) are adherents of Tibetan Buddhism, while a minority of 400,000 people are followers the native Bon or folk religions which share the image of Confucius (Tibetan: Kongtse Trulgyi Gyalpo) with Chinese folk religion, though in a different light. According to some reports, the government of China has been promoting the Bon religion, linking it with Confucianism.

Most of the Han Chinese who reside in Tibet practice their native Chinese folk religion. There is a Guandi Temple of Lhasa where the Chinese god of war Guandi is identified with the cross-ethnic Chinese, Tibetan, Mongol and Manchu deity Gesar. The temple is built according to both Chinese and Tibetan architecture. It was first erected in 1792 under the Qing dynasty and renovated around 2013 after decades of disrepair.

Built or rebuilt between 2014 and 2015 is the Guandi Temple of Qomolangma (Mount Everest), on Ganggar Mount, in Tingri County.

There are four mosques in the Tibet Autonomous Region with approximately 4,000 to 5,000 Muslim adherents, although a 2010 Chinese survey found a higher proportion of 0.4%. There is a Catholic church with 700 parishioners, which is located in the traditionally Catholic community of Yanjing in the east of the region.

Human rights

Before the annexation of Tibet by the People's Republic of China in 1951, Tibet was ruled by a theocracy and had a caste-like social hierarchy. Human rights in Tibet prior to its incorporation into the People's Republic of China differed considerably from those in the modern era. Due to tight control of press in mainland China, including the Tibet Autonomous Region, it is difficult to accurately determine the scope of human rights abuses.

Critics of the Chinese Communist Party (CCP) say the CCP's official aim to eliminate "the three evils of separatism, terrorism and religious extremism" is used as a pretext for human rights abuses. A 1992 Amnesty International report stated that judicial standards in the Tibet Autonomous Region were not up to "international standards". The report charged the CCP government with keeping political prisoners and prisoners of conscience; ill-treatment of detainees, including torture, and inaction in the face of ill-treatment; the use of the death penalty; extrajudicial executions; and forced abortion and sterilization.

Towns and villages in Tibet

Comfortable Housing Program 
Beginning in 2006, 280,000 Tibetans who lived in traditional villages and as nomadic herdsmen have been forcefully relocated into villages and towns. In those areas, new housing was built and existing houses were remodelled to serve a total of 2 million people.
Those living in substandard housing were required to dismantle their houses and remodel them to government standards. Much of the expense was borne by the residents themselves, often through bank loans. The population transfer program, which was first implemented in Qinghai where 300,000 nomads were resettled, is called "Comfortable Housing", which is part of the "Build a New Socialist Countryside" program. Its effect on Tibetan culture has been criticized by exiles and human rights groups. Finding employment is difficult for relocated persons who have only agrarian skills. Income shortfalls are offset by government support programs. It was announced that in 2011 that 20,000  Communist Party cadres will be placed in the new towns.

Economy 

From the 1951 Seventeen Point Agreement to 2003, life expectancy in Tibet increased from thirty-six years to sixty-seven years with infant mortality and absolute poverty declining steadily.

The Tibetans traditionally depended upon agriculture for survival. Since the 1980s, however, other jobs such as taxi-driving and hotel retail work have become available in the wake of Chinese economic reform. In 2011, Tibet's nominal GDP topped 60.5 billion yuan (US$9.60 billion), nearly more than seven times as big as the 11.78 billion yuan (US$1.47 billion) in 2000. Economic growth since the beginning of the 21st century has averaged over 10 percent a year. By 2020 the GDP of the region surpassed 190 billion yuan (US$29.2 billion).

While traditional agriculture and animal husbandry continue to lead the area's economy, in 2005 the tertiary sector contributed more than half of its GDP growth, the first time it surpassed the area's primary industry. Rich reserves of natural resources and raw materials have yet to lead to the creation of a strong secondary sector, due in large part to the province's inhospitable terrain, low population density, an underdeveloped infrastructure and the high cost of extraction.

The collection of caterpillar fungus (Cordyceps sinensis, known in Tibetan as Yartsa Gunbu) in late spring / early summer is in many areas the most important source of cash for rural households. It contributes an average of 40% to rural cash income and 8.5% to the Tibet Autonomous Region's GDP.

The re-opening of the Nathu La pass (on southern Tibet's border with India) should facilitate Sino-Indian border trade and boost Tibet's economy.

In 2008, Chinese news media reported that the per capita disposable incomes of urban and rural residents in Tibet averaged 12,482 yuan (US$1,798) and 3,176 yuan (US$457) respectively.

The China Western Development policy was adopted in 2000 by the central government to boost economic development in western China, including the Tibet Autonomous Region.

In 2021, GDP per capita (nominal) of Tibet AR is higher than all provincial-level devisions in south Asia.

 Lhasa Economic and Technological Development Zone

Education 
There are 4 universities and 3 special colleges in Tibet, including Tibet University, Tibet University for Nationalities, Tibet Tibetan Medical University, Tibet Agricultural and Animal Husbandry College, Lhasa Teachers College, Tibet Police College and Tibet Vocational and Technical College.

Tourism 

Foreign tourists were first permitted to visit the Tibet Autonomous Region in the 1980s. While the main attraction is the Potala Palace in Lhasa, there are many other popular tourist destinations including the Jokhang Temple, Namtso Lake, and Tashilhunpo Monastery. Nonetheless, tourism in Tibet is still restricted for non-Chinese passport holders (including citizens of the Republic of China from Taiwan), and foreigners must apply for a Tibet Entry Permit to enter the region.

Transportation
A 2019 white paper from The State Council Information Office of the People's Republic of China reported Tibet’s road system has achieved a total of 118,800 km.

Airports 
The civil airports in Tibet are Lhasa Gonggar Airport, Qamdo Bangda Airport, Nyingchi Airport, and the Gunsa Airport.

Gunsa Airport in Ngari Prefecture began operations on 1 July 2010, to become the fourth civil airport in China's Tibet Autonomous Region.

The Peace Airport for Xigazê was opened for civilian use on 30 October 2010.

Announced in 2010, Nagqu Dagring Airport was expected to become the world's highest altitude airport, at 4,436 meters above sea level. However, in 2015 it was reported that construction of the airport has been delayed due to the necessity to develop higher technological standards.

Railway 
The Qinghai–Tibet Railway from Golmud to Lhasa was completed on 12 October 2005. It opened to regular trial service on 1 July 2006. Five pairs of passenger trains run between Golmud and Lhasa, with connections onward to Beijing, Chengdu, Chongqing, Guangzhou, Shanghai, Xining and Lanzhou. The line includes the Tanggula Pass, which, at 5,072 m (16,640 ft) above sea level, is the world's highest railway.

The Lhasa–Xigazê Railway branch from Lhasa to Xigazê was completed in 2014. It opened to regular service on 15 August 2014. The planned China–Nepal railway will connect Xigazê to Kathmandu, capital of Nepal, and is expected to be completed around 2027.

The construction of the Sichuan–Tibet Railway began in 2015. The line is expected to be completed around 2025.

See also 

 China Tibetology Research Center
 Annexation of Tibet by the People's Republic of China
 History of Tibet (1950–present)
 Kazara
 List of prisons in the Tibet Autonomous Region
 List of universities and colleges in Tibet
 Tibet Area (administrative division)
 Tibetan independence movement
 Sinicization of Tibet
 Shigatse Photovoltaic Power Plant

Notes

References

Citations

Sources

Further reading 
 , travelogue from Tibet – by a woman who's been travelling around Tibet for over a decade,
 , hardcover, 236 pages.

External links 

 Tibet Autonomous Region official website
 Economic profile for Tibet Autonomous Region at HKTDC
 Population Structure and Changes in the Tibet Autonomous Region

 
Autonomous regions of China
Tibetan autonomous areas
~
Western China
1965 establishments in China
States and territories established in 1965
Tibetan Plateau